Marga Tjoa (born 27 January 1943) is an Indonesian popular romance and children's literature writer better known by the pen name Marga T. One of Indonesia's most prolific writers, she first became well known in 1971 for her serial Karmila that was published as a book in 1973 and later made into a film. As of 2006, she has published 38 novels.

Biography
Marga Tjoa was born Tjoa Liang Tjoe (Hokkien: Chhoà Liâng-chu) to a Catholic Chinese Indonesian (peranakan) family in Jakarta in 1943. She started writing young and by age 21, had published her first short story, "Room 27". It was followed by her first book in 1969, a children's story titled My Home is My Castle. During this time she was also educated as a physician at Trisakti University.

Tjoa became famous after first novel, Karmila, was published in 1971. In 1972 she followed Karmilas success with The Storm Will Surely Pass, which was serialized in Kompas between 5 June and 2 September 1972, with a novelized version being published in 1974. Both novels were adapted into movies, with Badai Pasti Berlalu going on to win four Citra awards. This early success convinced her to continue writing.

During the late 1970s and throughout the 1980s and 1990s, Tjoa published more popular novels, including An Illusion, The Red Saga, and Doctor Sabara's Secret. She also published some collections of short stories, including Love Song and Monik.

In 2004, Tjoa published A Bud of Hope to commemorate the eighth anniversary of the 1998 Jakarta Riots. It deals with the violence and rape of Chinese women during the riots.

As of 2006, Tjoa has written 80 short stories, 50 pieces of children's literature, and 38 novels.

Tjoa currently lives in Central Jakarta.

Chinese-Indonesian identity
Tjoa has been seen as trying to distance herself from her Chinese-Indonesian background during a period of legislation regarding Chinese culture in Indonesia, as evidenced by her use of a neutral pen name and a general disregard for Chinese culture and problems in her literary works. Her diction is also described as "identical to that of indigenous writers." As a result, many readers do not realize that Tjoa is Chinese-Indonesian.

Selected works
Her works include:

Notes

1943 births
Living people
Indonesian Roman Catholics
Indonesian writers
Indonesian people of Chinese descent
Indonesian women writers
People from Jakarta
Trisakti University alumni